The Stars and Stripes trilogy is a collection of three alternate history novels written by Harry Harrison.

Setting
All three novels involve the point of divergence of British involvement in the American Civil War after the Trent Affair. This happens when Prince Albert dies prematurely rather than playing his historic role in resolving the crisis. Queen Victoria blames the U.S. for his death. She authorizes her ministers to do anything necessary to ensure that the U.S. pays for it.

While 1861 is the relevant point of departure, there is another unexplained difference—the Duke of Wellington is still alive in 1862, though he remarks he has been "living on borrowed time" since his illness in 1852 (his death date in our world). This seems to date the initial point of divergence to 1852, without the butterfly effect changing intermediate occurrences, such as the course of the Crimean War.

Novels
 Stars and Stripes Forever (1998)
 Stars and Stripes in Peril (2000)
 Stars and Stripes Triumphant (2002)

See also

 American Civil War alternate histories

External links
 
 "A Naval Review"—another criticism of the book, at Ironclads and Blockade Runners Of the American Civil War
 —a look at what would have really happened if  fought 
 The Contest in America by John Stuart Mill—a small download

Alternate history book series
American Civil War alternate histories
Novels set during the American Civil War
Novels by Harry Harrison
Science fiction book series
Steampunk novels